Temple Court is the site of a closed railway station platform on the Main North railway line on the outskirts of the Hunter Region town of Murrurundi in New South Wales, Australia. The station was opened in late April 1878 and closed in 1975. No trace of it remains.

A Kerosene shale deposit had been located in early 1862 but the difficult terrain of the Liverpool Ranges provided transport problems. In 1871 a shale mine was started north of the area at Mount Temi. This was re-visited in 1884 but not until a loop siding, north of Temple Court, was constructed in 1910 was a short rail line to the mine discharge constructed.

References

Disused regional railway stations in New South Wales
Railway stations in Australia opened in 1878
Railway stations closed in 1975
Main North railway line, New South Wales